Cataegidae is a family of small sea snails, marine gastropod mollusks in the superfamily Seguenzioidea.

Taxonomy

2005 taxonomy
Cataegidae was classified as the subfamily Cataeginae within Chilodontidae according to the taxonomy of the Gastropoda by Bouchet & Rocroi, 2005.

2009 taxonomy 
Kano et al. (2009) elevated the subfamily Cataeginae to the family level.

Genera
Genera within the family Cataegidae include:
 Cataegis McLean & Quinn, 1987
 Kanoia Warén & Rouse, 2016
 Nemocataegis Hickman, 2017

References

External links
 To World Register of Marine Species
 To Encyclopedia of Life